Anisette Torp-Lind (born 20 May 1971) is a Danish former competitive figure skater. She is the 1990 Skate Canada International interpretive bronze medalist, a three-time Nordic medalist, and a seven-time Danish national champion. She represented Denmark at the 1992 Winter Olympics in Albertville, placing 15th.

Competitive highlights

References 

1971 births
Danish female single skaters
Olympic figure skaters of Denmark
Living people
People from Hørsholm Municipality
Figure skaters at the 1992 Winter Olympics
Sportspeople from the Capital Region of Denmark